The Sagamihara stabbings were committed on 26 July 2016 in Midori Ward, Sagamihara, Kanagawa, Japan. Nineteen people were killed and twenty-six others were injured, thirteen severely, at a care home for disabled people. Uematsu surrendered at a nearby police station with a bag of knives and was subsequently arrested. Justin McCurry of The Guardian described the attack as one of the worst crimes committed on Japanese soil in modern history.

Location

Established by the local government, the facility was built in a  area of woodland on the bank of the Sagami River. , the facility housed 149 residents between the ages of 19 and 75, all of whom had an intellectual disability but many with various physical disabilities as well. Some were capable of engaging in physical activities outdoors, while others were bedridden.

Attack
At about 02:10, Satoshi Uematsu allegedly used a hammer to break into the care centre through a glass window on the first floor. He tied up a staff member, took their keys, and then went from room to room, stabbing the victims in their necks as they slept. Police were called to the care center by staff members at around 02:30 local time, reporting a man with a knife breaking into the building. However, Uematsu left the premises before being apprehended; he was recorded leaving the facility at 02:50 in security camera footage.

Armed police entered the building at around 03:00 where they discovered the crime scene. Twenty-nine ambulances were sent to the facility. The suspect turned himself in at the Tsukui Police Station two hours after the incident with a bag containing kitchen knives and other bloodstained sharp tools. A knife was reportedly found in his car outside the police station.

Uematsu killed ten women and nine men aged between 18 and 70 and injured 26 more, thirteen severely.

Perpetrator

 (born 20 January 1990), a 26-year-old (at the time of the incident) man, used to work at the care home Tsukui Yamayuri En. His father was an elementary school art teacher, and Uematsu had trained and worked as an elementary school teacher as well. He had lived in his house with his parents, but they moved away at some point and he remained there alone. He resigned from working at the facility in February 2016 after having been employed there for over three years.

Neighbors expressed surprise that he had allegedly committed the murders; he was described as a friendly, outgoing and good man. However, some reported that his personality had undergone a change at some point during his employment at the facility.

Letter and statements
In February 2016, Uematsu attempted to hand-deliver a letter to Tadamori Ōshima, the Speaker of the House of Representatives of Japan, at Ōshima's home in Tokyo but was prevented from doing so by security. He returned the following day and this time left the letter with the security guards. Uematsu's letter appealed for the legalization of ending the lives of those with multiple disabilities in cases where it was requested by their guardians, and asked for Ōshima's assistance in delivering his message to Japanese Prime Minister Shinzō Abe. In it, he wrote, "I envision a world where a person with multiple disabilities can be euthanised, with an agreement from the guardians, when it is difficult for the person to carry out household and social activities." He also wrote that the killings of disabled people would be "for the sake of Japan and world peace" as well as to benefit the global economy and prevent World War III.

After signing his name, the letter proceeded to detail an offer to target two facilities housing disabled people (possibly a reference to the two residential buildings in which he later committed the crime), and went on to appeal for certain conditions in exchange for committing the act. In the first half of the message, Uematsu said he could kill 460 people; however, in the second half, the number he gave was 260. He added that staff would be tied up to keep them from interfering but that they would not be harmed, the act would be swift, and that afterwards he would turn himself in. At the end of the latter half of the letter, he signed his name again, this time with his address, telephone number, and the name of his employer.

Later that month, after his letter was brought to the attention of Sagamihara's authorities, he was arrested, detained, questioned, and then involuntarily committed to a psychiatric hospital for two weeks. However, he was released on 2 March after doctors deemed that he was not a threat.

In his letter and in statements made after turning himself in, Uematsu explained that he was "saving from unhappiness" both the severely disabled and those who he believed were burdened with maintaining their lives.

Legal proceedings
On 20 February 2017, Uematsu was found mentally competent to stand trial. On 24 February 2019, Uematsu was charged with 19 counts of murder, 24 counts of attempted murder, two counts of illegal confinement causing injury, three counts of illegal confinement, one count of unlawful entry, and one count of violating the Firearm and Sword Possession Control Law.

Uematsu's defense team said they planned to argue that he was mentally incompetent at the time of the crime, due to the effects of marijuana. On 23 December 2019, Uematsu said he would admit to the crime during the trial, saying that denying the charges against him "would be quibbling and make the trial too complex."

On 8 January 2020, Uematsu pleaded not guilty to the stabbings. On 17 February 2020, the prosecution announced that the death penalty was officially sought against Uematsu saying the rampage was "inhumane" and left "no room for leniency."

On 16 March 2020, Uematsu was sentenced to death by the Yokohama District Court, having previously said he would not challenge any verdict or sentence.

On 30 March 2020, Uematsu's death sentence was finalized as he withdrew automatic appeal to the upper courts.

In April 2022, two years after his sentencing, Uematsu appealed for a re-trial for his case, and the petition is pending in the courts .

Reactions
Yoshihide Suga, the Japanese Chief Cabinet Secretary at the time, acknowledged that the attack was "a very heart-wrenching and shocking incident in which many innocent people became victims". He also said that the Ministry of Health, Labour, and Welfare would investigate ways to prevent a similar incident from occurring again.

A number of Japanese news outlets ran editorials calling the stabbings a hate crime. By September 2016, little information had been released about the victims of the attack. Reuters wrote that this was due to Japanese culture and stigma, being less accepting of physically and cognitively impaired persons.

The care home facility has been demolished. Nearby structures where no one was attacked, such as the administration building and gymnasium, remain. On 13 September 2016, the governor of Kanagawa Prefecture, Yūji Kuroiwa, said the facility would be rebuilt.  The new facility of two buildings opened in July 2021.

In popular culture 
The 26th of July is considered a significant date in disability history. In addition to being the date of the Sagamihara stabbings, 26 July 1990 saw the enactment of the world's first national legislation outlawing disability discrimination: the Americans with Disabilities Act.

One year after the stabbings, on July 26, 2017, a documentary was released entitled Nineteen Paper Cranes by filmmaker Michael Joseph McDonald. The film follows a deaf Japanese papermaker with Kibuki Syndrome as she memorializes the nineteen victims of the Sagamihara stabbings.

See also

 Capital punishment in Japan
Ableism
Aktion T4
Life unworthy of life

References

External links
19 lives: Sagamihara stabbings NHK (In Japanese)
Demolition Work Starts at Sagamihara Care Home after 2016 Massacre Nippon.com

2016 murders in Japan
2016 murders in Asia
Mass murder in 2016
2020s trials
Crime in Kanagawa Prefecture
Disability in Japan
History of Kanagawa Prefecture
July 2016 crimes in Asia
Knife attacks
Mass murder in Japan
Mass stabbings in Japan
Massacres in 2016
Massacres in Japan
Murder trials
Sagamihara
Stabbing attacks in 2016
Trials in Japan
Violence against disabled people